Jure Močnik (born August 23, 1985) is a Slovenian former professional basketball player.

References 
kkhelios.si Personal Profile

1985 births
Living people
ABA League players
Greek Basket League players
Peristeri B.C. players
Point guards
Slovenian men's basketball players
Basketball players from Ljubljana
Helios Suns players